The South Carolina Gamecocks men's basketball team represents the University of South Carolina and competes in the Southeastern Conference (SEC). The Gamecocks won Southern Conference titles in 1927, 1933, 1934, and 1945, and then they gained national attention under hall of fame coach Frank McGuire, posting a 205–65 record from 1967 to 1976, which included the 1970 Atlantic Coast Conference (ACC) championship, the 1971 ACC Tournament title, and four consecutive NCAA tournament appearances from 1971 to 1974.  The program also won the 1997 SEC championship, National Invitation Tournament (NIT) titles in 2005 and 2006, and a share of the 2009 SEC Eastern division title.  Most recently, the Gamecocks won the 2017 NCAA East Regional Championship, reaching the Final Four for the first time in school history. Lamont Paris is the current head coach, and the team plays at the 18,000-seat Colonial Life Arena.

History

Southern Conference years
South Carolina achieved a measure of regional prominence during its tenure in the Southern Conference, winning regular season championships in 1927, 1933, 1934, and 1945.  The program also won the conference's tournament championship in 1933.  During World War II, the basketball team's success was partially attributed to being assigned outstanding athletes by the U.S. Navy as part of the V-12 program.  However, the Navy leaders kept the teams focus towards the war effort, and USC declined an invitation to the Southern Conference Tournament in 1944.

Frank McGuire era (1965–1980)

The hiring of Frank McGuire before the 1964–65 season propelled South Carolina to its most successful period to date.  McGuire's 16-year tenure was highlighted by an undefeated ACC regular season in 1970, an ACC Tournament championship in 1971, and three consecutive Sweet 16 appearances from 1971 to 1973.  USC also posted a 69–16 overall record from 1968 to 1971, and John Roche won consecutive ACC Player of the Year Awards (1969–1970).  In November 1968, the Gamecocks began playing at the 12,401 seat Carolina Coliseum, which became known as the "House that Frank Built."  The success South Carolina achieved on the court brought resentment and anger from fellow ACC schools, especially those on "Tobacco Road," as the conference members of the state of North Carolina were known.  The hostility of the road crowds, the unfriendly behavior of coaches and athletic directors in the conference, and the discrepancies in eligibility to compete in the NCAA tournament, which at that time was delegated strictly to the winner of the ACC tournament despite that year's championship game being the only Gamecocks loss, led McGuire to support South Carolina becoming an Independent before the 1971–72 season.

As an independent, the program gradually declined, and the university sought entrance into an athletic conference.  This proved problematic because most conferences required schools to have a single athletic director, and South Carolina had multiple directors at the time.  McGuire served as athletic director for the basketball program, and he would not relinquish his position.  The university made several attempts to obtain McGuire's resignation, but ultimately honored his contract through 1980.  McGuire finished with a 283–142 overall record at South Carolina and continues to be held in high regard by Gamecock fans.  His six consecutive 20-win seasons from 1969 to 1974, which produced a 137–33 record, remain the benchmark for USC Basketball.

Metro Conference and SEC
In 1983, the university became affiliated with the Metro Conference.  The basketball program was placed on probation by the NCAA in the spring of 1987 for two years because of recruiting violations and the sale of complimentary player tickets.  From 1987 to 1991, George Felton led the Gamecocks to an 87–62 overall record, which included a 1989 NCAA Tournament appearance and a 1991 NIT berth.  For three of Felton's five seasons (1987–1989), Tubby Smith served as an assistant coach before leaving to join Rick Pitino's staff at Kentucky.  South Carolina joined the SEC before the 1992 season and initially struggled, posting a combined 20–35 record in 1992 and 1993.

Eddie Fogler era (1994–2001)
Eddie Fogler was hired away from Vanderbilt before the 1994 season and within a few years returned the Gamecocks to respectability.  Under Fogler, South Carolina posted an impressive 66–28 record (34–14 SEC) during the 1996–1998 stretch, which included the school's first SEC championship in 1997.  The 1997 Gamecocks posted a 15–1 record in SEC play and defeated league rival Kentucky twice, but lost in the First Round of the NCAA Tournament.  Fogler stepped down after the 2001 campaign, going 123–117 in eight seasons as the Gamecocks' head coach.  His tenure included two NCAA Tournament appearances (1997, 1998) and two NIT appearances (1996, 2001).  Fogler retired as one of the most successful head coaches in SEC Basketball history, having won regular season conference championships at both Vanderbilt and South Carolina.

Dave Odom era (2002–2008)
Subsequent coach Dave Odom posted four 20-win seasons during his tenure at South Carolina.  He led the Gamecocks to an appearance in the 2004 NCAA Tournament and consecutive NIT championships in 2005 and 2006. Odom's tenure also saw USC begin play at the 18,000 seat Colonial Life Arena during the 2002–2003 season.  Following the 2007–2008 campaign, Odom resigned with a 128–104 overall record at USC.

Darrin Horn era (2009–2012)
On April 1, 2008, Darrin Horn was named the new head basketball coach at USC.  In his first season, Horn led the Gamecocks to a 21–10 record (10–6 SEC), two victories over Kentucky, and a share of the 2009 SEC Eastern Division title.  After a 10–21 campaign in 2011–12, his third straight losing season, Horn was fired on March 13, 2012, finishing his tenure at Carolina with a 60–63 overall record and a 23–45 mark in the SEC.

Frank Martin era (2012–2022)

Frank Martin came to USC from Kansas State, where he had enjoyed five winning seasons and four NCAA Tournament appearances, including an Elite Eight appearance with the Wildcats in 2010. After losing records in his first two seasons with the Gamecocks, he achieved a winning season in 2015, then reached the NIT in 2016, and then broke through into the 2017 NCAA Tournament, the program's first appearance in the event since 2004. On March 17, 2017, USC achieved its first NCAA Tournament victory since 1973 with a 20-point win over the Marquette Golden Eagles. Two nights later, the Gamecocks upset the #2 seed Duke Blue Devils to advance to their fourth Sweet 16. South Carolina then beat #3 seed Baylor Bears to advance to their first-ever Elite 8, two days later they upset Florida to advance to their first ever Final Four.

Lamont Paris era (2022–present)
Former Chattanooga head coach Lamont Paris was named head coach on March 21, 2022 to replace the terminated Frank Martin.

Year-by-year results

Postseason

NCAA tournament results
The Gamecocks have appeared in the NCAA tournament nine times. Their combined record is 8–10.

NIT results
The Gamecocks have appeared in the National Invitation Tournament (NIT) 12 times. Their combined record is 22–10. They were NIT champions in 2005 and 2006.

Conference championships
 1927 SoCon (season) – South Carolina went 14–4 overall and 9–1 in Southern Conference play.
 1933 SoCon (season & tournament) – South Carolina posted a 17–2 record (4–1 SoCon) and won the Southern Conference tournament.
 1934 SoCon (season) – South Carolina went 18–1 overall and 6–0 in Southern Conference play.
 1945 SoCon (season) – South Carolina went 19–3 overall and 9–0 in Southern Conference play.
 1970 ACC (season) – South Carolina went 25–3 overall and 14–0 in ACC play.
 1971 ACC (tournament) – South Carolina posted a 23–6 overall record and defeated North Carolina for the ACC Tournament title.
 1997 SEC (season & division) – South Carolina posted a 24–8 record (15–1 SEC) to win the SEC championship and Eastern Division title.
 2009 SEC East (division) – South Carolina went 21–10 overall and 10–6 in SEC play to win a share of the SEC East title.

Head coaches

All-Americans

Awards

National Scoring Leader
 Grady Wallace – 1957 (31.3 ppg)
 Zam Fredrick – 1981 (28.9 ppg)

ACC Player of the Year
 John Roche – 1969, 1970

All-ACC First Team
 Grady Wallace – 1957
 Art Whisnant – 1962
 Ronnie Collins – 1964
 Skip Harlicka – 1968
 John Roche – 1969, 1970, 1971
 Tom Owens – 1970, 1971

All-ACC Second Team
 Grady Wallace – 1956
 Art Whisnant – 1960, 1961
 Scott Ward – 1963
 Gary Gregor – 1967, 1968
 Jack Thompson – 1967
 Frank Standard – 1968
 Tom Owens – 1969

ACC Tournament Outstanding Player
 John Roche – 1971

Metro Conference Newcomer of the Year
 Linwood Moye – 1985

All-Metro First Team
 Jimmy Foster – 1984

All-Metro Second Team
 Linwood Moye – 1986
 Michael Foster – 1987
 Darryl Martin – 1987
 John Hudson – 1988, 1989
 Jo Jo English – 1991

SEC Player of the Year
 Sindarius Thornwell – 2017

SEC Rookie of the Year
 BJ McKie – 1996

SEC Coach of the Year
 Dave Odom – 2004

SEC Defensive Player of the Year
 Sam Muldrow – 2011
 Chris Silva – 2018

SEC Sixth Man of the Year
 Brandis Raley-Ross – 2009
 Duane Notice – 2016
 Hassani Gravett – 2019

All-SEC First Team
 Larry Davis – 1997
 BJ McKie – 1997, 1998, 1999
 Tre' Kelley – 2007
 Devan Downey – 2008, 2009, 2010
 Michael Carrera – 2016
 Sindarius Thornwell – 2017
 Chris Silva – 2018

All-SEC Second Team
 Jamie Watson – 1993, 1994
 Larry Davis – 1996
 Melvin Watson – 1997, 1998
 Tarence Kinsey – 2006
 Dominique Archie – 2009
 Zam Fredrick, Jr. – 2009

All-SEC Third Team
 Emmitt Hall – 1993, 1994
 Melvin Watson – 1996
 Marijonas Petravičius – 2001
 Jamel Bradley – 2002
 Carlos Powell – 2004, 2005
 Brandon Wallace – 2007

NIT Most Valuable Player
 Carlos Powell – 2005
 Renaldo Balkman – 2006

Gamecocks in the NBA
Chris Silva Play for the Miami heat
 Alex English –   member of the Basketball Hall of Fame, 8x All-Star, accumulated a career total of 25,613 points, 6,538 rebounds, and 4,351 assists
 Renaldo Balkman – drafted 20th overall in the 2006 NBA draft to the New York Knicks, retired
 PJ Dozier – Denver Nuggets
 Mike Dunleavy Sr. – drafted 99th overal in the 1976 NBA draft to the Philadelphia 76ers Former head coach of the Los Angeles Clippers
 Sindarius Thornwell – drafted 48th overall in the 2017 NBA draft by the Los Angeles Clippers
 Jim Slaughter – drafted 31st overall in the 1951 NBA draft by the Atlanta Hawks, retired
 Jim Fox –drafted 67th overall in the 1965 NBA draft to the Cincinnati Kings, retired
 Gary Gregor – drafted 8th overall in the 1968 NBA draft to the Phoenix Suns, retired
 Skip Harlicka – drafted 13th overall in the 1968 NBA draft to the Atlanta Hawks
 John Roche – drafted 14th overall in the 1971 NBA draft to the Phoenix Suns, retired
 Tom Owens – drafted 58th overall in the 1971 NBA draft by the Houston Rockets, retired
 Tom Riker – drafted 8th overall in the 1972 NBA draft by the New York Knicks, retired
 Kevin Joyce – drafted 11th overall in the 1973 NBA draft to the Golden State Warriors, retired
 Brian Winters – drafted 12th overall in the 1974 NBA draft to the Los Angeles Lakers
 Tom Boswell – drafted 17th overall in the 1975 NBA draft to the Boston Celtics, retired
 Cedrick Hordges – drafted 49th overall in the 1979 NBA draft by the Chicago Bulls, retired
 Mike Brittain – drafted 29th overall in the 1985 NBA draft by the San Antonio Spurs, retired
 Jo Jo English – undrafted 1992 NBA draft, signed with Chicago Bulls, retired
 Jamie Watson – Only draft pick by the Utah Jazz in the 1996 NBA draft Sacramento Kings, Dallas Mavericks, and Miami Heat, retired
 Ryan Stack – drafted 48th overall in the 1998 NBA draft to the Cleveland Cavaliers, retired
 Tarence Kinsey – undrafted in the 2006 NBA draft, signed with Memphis Grizzlies, retired

2021 Gamecocks in the NBA

A.J. Lawson (Atlanta)

Chris Silva (Minnesota)

Hassani Gravett (Orlando)

Brian Bowen II (Minnesota)

Anthony Gill (Washington)

Sindarius Thornwell (free agent)

Retired numbers

South Carolina has retired five jersey numbers.

References

External links